Mangala Vaathiyam is a 1979 Indian Tamil-language film, directed by K. Shankar and produced by Gopikrishnan son of M. S. Viswanathan. The film stars Kamal Haasan, Sripriya, Y. G. Mahendran and Nagesh. It was released on 21 September 1979.

Plot

Cast 
 Kamal Haasan
 Sripriya
 Nagesh
 Y. G. Mahendran
 Ganthimathi
 Srikanth
 V. K. Ramasamy
 T. K. S. Natarajan

Soundtrack 
Soundtrack was composed by M. S. Viswanathan and lyrics were written by Kannadasan.

Release and reception 
Mangala Vaathiyam was released on 21 September 1979. Kousigan of Kalki wrote that writer Kalaimani and director K. Sankar had tried their best to make Mangala Vaathiyam entertaining but it was not fulfilling.

References

External links 
 

1970s Tamil-language films
1979 films
Films directed by K. Shankar
Films scored by M. S. Viswanathan